Lee Jae-woo (born 28 September 1979) is a Korean handball player who competed in the 2000 Summer Olympics, in the 2004 Summer Olympics, in the 2008 Summer Olympics and the 2012 Summer Olympics.

References

External links

1979 births
Living people
South Korean male handball players
Olympic handball players of South Korea
Handball players at the 2000 Summer Olympics
Handball players at the 2004 Summer Olympics
Handball players at the 2008 Summer Olympics
Handball players at the 2012 Summer Olympics
Asian Games medalists in handball
Handball players at the 1998 Asian Games
Handball players at the 2002 Asian Games
Handball players at the 2006 Asian Games
Handball players at the 2010 Asian Games
Asian Games gold medalists for South Korea
Medalists at the 1998 Asian Games
Medalists at the 2002 Asian Games
Medalists at the 2010 Asian Games